Agonum fidele is a species of ground beetle from Platyninae subfamily that can be found in United States and Canada.

References

External links
Agonum fidele on Bug Guide

Beetles described in 1820
fidele
Beetles of North America